Armadillidium pulchellum is a species of crustaceans belonging to the family Armadillidiidae.

It is native to Europe.

References

Woodlice